The 2017–18 Liga Gimel season was the 50th season of fifth tier football in Israel, with 105 clubs competing in 8 regional divisions for promotion to Liga Bet.

Changes from last season

Team changes

Promotion and relegation

 To replace the folded Hapoel F.C. Karmiel Safed, Tzeirei Tamra was promoted from Liga Gimel, as the best second-placed team in the northern divisions.
 In December 2016, the IFA was ordered to demote Maccabi Umm al-Fahm to Liga Gimel by FIFA due to an unpaid debt. The club, which finished 11th in North B division was demoted at the end of the season and was replaced initially by Maccabi Ironi Tamra, the second best second-placed team in the northern divisions of Liga Gimel. However, an appeal was lodged by Beitar Pardes Hanna, which was the best second-placed team in the Liga Gimel division which promote to North B division, claiming that only teams from the Jezre'el and Samaria division should be considered for promotion as replacement to Maccabi Umm al-Fahm. The IFA Supreme Court accepted the appeal and Promoted Beitar Pardes Hanna to Liga Bet.

Format changes
 The IFA introduced promotion/relegations playoffs between Liga Bet and Liga Gimel. As a result, The two clubs placed 2nd and 3rd in each Liga Gimel division will qualify for the promotion play-offs. In each pair of divisions (Upper Galilee and Lower Galilee, Jezreel and Samaria, Sharon and Tel Aviv and Central and South) The 2nd placed club will host the 3rd placed club in each division, followed by a match between the two winners to decide the relegation/promotion match against the losing team from the Liga Bet relegation play-offs for a spot in Liga Bet.
 To clarify the order of promotion for filling vacant places in Liga Bet, the IFA announced that the first club to be promoted if such vacancy would be created, for each Liga Bet division only clubs from its corresponding Liga Gimel divisions would be eligible for promotion (Upper Galilee and Lower Galilee to North A division, Jezreel and Samaria to North B division, etc.). The losing club in the third round of the play-offs would be first to be promoted, followed by points-per-match average in the league.

Upper Galilee (North A) Division

Results

Positions by round

Source: Liga Gimel Upper Galilee IFA

Lower Galilee (North B) Division

Results

Positions by round

Jezreel (North C) Division

Results

Positions by round

Source: Liga Gimel Jezreel IFA 

1On 27 December 2017 Maccabi Umm al-Fahm was temporarily expelled from the league after the club had a check bounced and the club failed to rectify the situation within a month. The club was reinstated on 10 January 2018.

Samaria (North D) Division

Results

Positions by round

Source: Liga Gimel Samaria IFA

Sharon (South A) Division

Results

Positions by round

Source: Liga Gimel Sharon IFA

Tel Aviv (South B) Division

Results

Positions by round

Source: IFA

Central (South C) Division

Results

Positions by round

Source: IFA

South (South D) Division

Results

Positions by round

Source: Liga Gimel South IFA

Promotion play-offs

North A division

1The match result was 1–0 to Maccabi Ironi Yafa (after extra time). However, as Kafr Manda fielded an ineligible player, the match was given as a walkover to Yafa.

Maccabi Ironi Yafa remained in Liga Gimel; Sektzia Ma'alot remained in Liga Bet

North B division

Ihud Bnei Baqa remained in Liga Gimel; Maccabi Ein Mahil remained in Liga Bet

South A division

1The match was abandoned at the 36th minute following a brawl between the teams. The match was annulled and neither team advanced to the next round.

Bnei Yehud remained in Liga Gimel; Hapoel Kiryat Ono remained in Liga Bet

South B division

Ironi Kuseife Promoted to Liga Bet; Tzeirei Rahat relegated to Liga Gimel

Further promotions
The following teams are eligible to promotion if a vacancy would be created in 2018–19 Liga Bet:

North A

South A

As both Bnei Ra'anana and Otzma Holon are equal on points-per-match average, Bnei Ra'anana are ahead on winning percentage (0.71% and 0.70%)

North B

South B

As both Hapoel Bnei Ashdod and Beitar Yavne are equal on points-per-match average and winning percentage, Hapoel Bnei Ashdod are ahead on goal difference (+82 and +60).

References

Liga Gimel seasons
5
Israel